Schizocolea is a genus of flowering plants in the family Rubiaceae. It is the only genus in the tribe Schizocoleeae. The genus is found in Guinea, Ivory Coast, Liberia, Sierra Leone, Gabon, Democratic Republic of the Congo, and Angola.

Species
Schizocolea linderi (Hutch. & Dalziel) Bremek.
Schizocolea ochreata E.M.A.Petit

References

Rubiaceae genera
Rubioideae